Brugmansia arborea, the angel's trumpet, is a species of flowering plant in the family Solanaceae. The IUCN has classed Brugmansia arborea as Extinct in the Wild.

Description
The ovate leaves have coarsely toothed margins when in their best condition. The leaves, flower stalks, fruit, and especially the young shoots are covered with fine velvety white down. Flowers are strongly fragrant,  trumpet-shaped, nodding to sub-horizontal, white to ivory-white or cream. Flowers are produced almost continuously in smaller quantities, unlike many other Brugmansia that flower in larger flushes. The calyx is slit along one side and is very long in relation to the flower, and in this respect is often used as a quick check to verify correct identification. With a few exceptions, the Green Calyx usually reaches down almost all the way to the flower corolla's mouth.

Taxonomy

In his 1753 Species Plantarum, Carl Linnaeus published Datura arborea using as his type specimen a drawing by Louis Feuillée from 1714 with name Stramonioides arboreum, oblongo et integro folio, fructu laevi, vulgo Flori pondio. Then Robert Sweet, in his 1818 Hortus Suburbanus Londinensis, published the modern version of the name to be in the separate genus of Brugmansia. Since then, many authors have published many different plants with one of those names, causing much confusion in the taxonomy of these plants. "Datura arborea" has many times been incorrectly used for almost any white-flowered Brugmansia plant, even in scientific literature.

Distribution and habitat
They are native to the Andes mountains of southern Colombia, Ecuador, Peru, western Bolivia, and northern Chile. Occurring at elevations of 2000 to 3000 m, they often receive light frosts.

Ecology
Brugmansia arborea are usually pollinated by moths. They are attracted by the white color of the flowers and their fragrance that gets stronger in the evenings.

The species is invasive in New Caledonia.

References

arborea
Flora of Bolivia
Flora of Colombia
Flora of Peru
Plants described in 1753
Taxa named by Carl Linnaeus